The men's 1500 metres event at the 1996 World Junior Championships in Athletics was held in Sydney, Australia, at International Athletic Centre on 23, 24 and 25 August.

Medalists

Results

Final
25 August

Semifinals
24 August

Semifinal 1

Semifinal 2

Heats
23 August

Heat 1

Heat 2

Heat 3

Heat 4

Participation
According to an unofficial count, 37 athletes from 29 countries participated in the event.

References

1500 metres
1500 metres at the World Athletics U20 Championships